Alienopteridae is an extinct family of dictyopterans, known from the Mid-Cretaceous to Eocene. They are noted for their unusual combination of features not found in other dictyopterans.

Description 
Alienopterid nymphs vary in morphology, some are superficially ant-like, while others are more robust. In adult alienopterids, the first set of wings are reduced into shortened sclerotised scale-like structures. The compound eyes are large, and the head generally triangular shaped and able to rotate.

Taxonomy 
It was originally assigned to its own order Alienoptera by Bai et al., 2016. It was reassigned to the dictyopteran superfamily Umenocoleoidea as sister family to the beetle-like Umenocoleidae by Vršanský et al. (2018), and a more recent analysis similarly places Alienopteridae and Umenocoleidae as sister taxa within Dictyoptera, but placing both lineages outside of Blattodea. A 2021 study revived the order Alienoptera for the clade containing Alienopteridae and Umenocoleidae, with a cladistic analysis placing Alienoptera as the sister clade to Mantodea (praying mantises).

Distribution 
The majority of the alienopterid genera are known from the mid Cretaceous (latest Albian-earliest Cenomanian ~ 100 million years ago) Burmese amber found in Myanmar; though an additional two genera (Apiblatta and Vcelesvab) are from the late Aptian Crato Formation (Brazil), and the two youngest genera (Chimaeroblattina and Grant) are from the middle Eocene Green River Formation (Colorado, United States).

Ecology 
In a 2018 paper, some alienopterid adults were suggested as mimics of various hymenopterans, including bees and ants. However this was mostly rejected in another study as lacking evidence. A 2021 study alternatively suggested that some alienopterid nymphs functioned as ant mimics, based on morphological features that closely resembled contemporary sphecomyrmine ants, and suggested that the adult genus Teyia was also a wasp mimic, though mimicry in other adult alienopterids was rejected. One alienopterid nymph was found laden with gymnosperm pollen (probably from a cycad or a bennettitalean), suggesting that it consumed pollen as part of its diet, and that it also acted as a pollinator. Alienopterid adults have been suggested to be predators adapted to moving through dense foliage, with the small sclerotised forewings being an adaptation for flight capaciity.

Genera
Superfamily †Umenocoleoidea Chen & Tan, 1973
Family †Alienopteridae Bai et al., 2016
 †Aethiocarenus Poinar & Brown, 2016
 †Alienopterella Kočárek, 2018
 †Alienopterus Bai et al. 2016
 †Apiblatta Barna & Bigalk, 2018
 †Caputoraptor Bai et al., 2018
 †Chimaeroblattina Barna, 2018
 †Formicamendax Hinkelman, 2019
 †Grant Aristov, 2018
 †Meilia Vršanský & Wang, 2018
 †Teyia Vršanský et al., 2018
 †Vcelesvab Vršanský et al. 2018
An undescribed species is also known from the Turonian aged Orapa kimberlite pipe sediments in Botswana. Luo, Xu & Jarzembowski (2020) transferred Alienopterix and Vzrkadlenies, originally described as alienopterids, to the family Cratovitismidae. A 2021 study later considered Alienopterix an umenocoleid instead.

References

Prehistoric insect families
Dictyoptera